The FG-47 (a.k.a. SpaB-54) is a Chinese solid rocket motor burning HTPB. It was developed by China Hexi Chemical and Machinery Corporation (also known as the 6th Academy of CASIC) for use in the Long March 2C SD/CTS/SMA third stage. It had its inaugural flight on the Iridium-MFS demonstration mission on September 1, 1997.

See also
 CTS
 Long March 2C
 Iridium deployment

References

Rocket engines of China
Solid-fuel rockets